This is a list of the people associated of Upsala College including the school's presidents, its faculty and alumni. Upsala College was a Lutheran-affiliated, private college located in East Orange, New Jersey (1899–1995).  After years of declining enrollment and financial problems, Upsala College closed in May 1995.

Presidents of Upsala College
Nine men have served as the president of Upsala College in its 102-year history.  Most of these men were Lutheran clergymen.  Only one, the Rev. Dr. Evald Benjamin Lawson (1904–1965), was an alumnus of Upsala College.

Faculty and staff

Academic faculty
 Richard Toensing, composer and music educator
 J. E. Wallace Wallin, visiting psychology professor, psychologist, early proponent of education for the mentally handicapped

Athletic staff
 Ron Rothstein, professional NBA basketball coach, former college basketball player, former teacher and basketball coach (1974-1975)

Alumni
This list of alumni includes both those who completed degree programs and graduated from Upsala College, as well as those who attended but did not graduate.

Academia and research

Politics and public service

Arts and entertainment

 Mike Largey (born 1960), basketball player in the Israeli Basketball Premier League
|-
| Chris Desiderio || B.A. 1988 || Renowned tonsorial artist

Fictional alumni
 The protagonist of Philip Roth's novel American Pastoral (1997), Seymour "Swede" Levov, and his wife, Dawn Levov, are graduates of Upsala.

References

Lists of people by university or college in New Jersey